Golyamo Novo is a village in Northern Bulgaria. The village is located in Targovishte Municipality, Targovishte Province. Аccording to the numbers provided by the 2020 Bulgarian census, Golyamo Novo currently has a population of 1239 people with a permanent address registered in the settlement.

Geography 
Golyamo Novo village is located in Municipality Targovishte. The elevation of the village ranges between 200 and 499 meters with an average elevation of 262 meters above sea level. The village's climate is continental.

Buildings and infrastructure 
The roads in the village are in good condition. There is an elementary school, a grocery store, and a pharmacy.

Other active buildings in the village are.

 Elementary school “G. S. Rakovski”
 The local community hall and library “Probuda” is still acting
 Kindergarten “Shtastlivo Detstvo”

Ethnicity 
According to the Bulgarian population census in 2011.

References 

Villages in Targovishte Province